Hechtia gayorum is a species of plant in the genus Hechtia and is the only monoecious species within the genus. This species is endemic to Mexico.

References

gayorum
Flora of Mexico